Look My Way is the third studio album by New York City hardcore punk band Madball.

Track listing

References 
[ Review] at Allmusic

Madball albums
1998 albums
Roadrunner Records albums